An ice cap climate is a polar climate where no mean monthly temperature exceeds . The climate covers areas in or near the high latitudes (65° latitude) to polar regions (70–90° north and south latitude), such as Antarctica, some of the northernmost islands of Canada and Russia. Most of Greenland is covered of Ice cap climate, only the coasts are mostly ET climate. Some regions and islands of Norway's Svalbard Archipelago that have vast deserts of snow and ice. Areas with ice cap climates are normally covered by a permanent layer of ice and have no vegetation. There is limited animal life in most ice cap climates,  usually found near the oceanic margins. Although ice cap climates are inhospitable to human life, there are some small research stations scattered in Antarctica and interior Greenland.

Description
Under the Köppen climate classification, the ice cap climate is denoted as EF. Ice caps are defined as a climate with no months above .  Such areas are found around the north and south pole, and on the top of many high mountains. Since the temperature never exceeds the melting point of ice, any snow or ice that accumulates remains there permanently, over time forming a large ice sheet.

The ice cap climate is distinct from the tundra climate, or ET. A tundra climate has a summer season with temperatures consistently above freezing for several months. This summer is enough to melt the winter ice cover, which prevents the formation of ice sheets. Because of this, tundras have vegetation, while ice caps do not.

Ice cap climate is the world's coldest climate, and includes the coldest places on Earth. The following chart indicates the average and record temperatures in this research station through a year:

Ice sheets

The constant freezing temperatures cause the formation of large ice sheets in ice cap climates. These ice sheets, however, are not static, but slowly move off the continents into the surrounding waters. New snow and ice accumulation then replaces the ice that is lost. Precipitation is nearly non-existent in ice cap climates. It is never warm enough for rain, and usually too cold to generate snow. However, wind can blow snow onto the ice sheets from nearby tundras.

Ice sheets are often miles thick. Much of the land located under ice sheets is actually below sea level, and would be under the ocean if the ice were removed. It is the weight of the ice itself that forces this land below sea level. If the ice was removed, the land would rise back up in an effect called post-glacial rebound. This effect is creating new land in formerly ice cap areas such as Sweden.

The extreme pressure exerted by the ice allows for the formation of liquid water at low temperatures that would otherwise result in ice, while the ice sheet itself insulates liquid water from the cold above. The causes the formation of subglacial lakes, the largest being Lake Vostok in Antarctica.

Geologic history
Ice cap climates only occur during icehouse Earth periods. There have been five such periods in the Earth's past. Outside these periods, the Earth seems to have been ice-free even in high latitudes. Factors that cause icehouse Earth include changes to the atmosphere, the arrangement of continents, and the energy received from the sun. Earth is currently in an icehouse period.

Locations
The two major areas with ice cap climates are Antarctica and Greenland. Some of the most northern islands of Canada and Russia, along with some regions and islands of Norway's Svalbard Archipelago also have ice cap climates. In addition, a large portion of the Arctic Ocean near the North Pole remains frozen year round, effectively making it an icecap climate.

Extreme northern latitudes

The Arctic Ocean is located in the Arctic region. As a result, the northern polar ice cap is the frozen part of that ocean's surface. The only large landmass in the extreme northern latitudes to have an icecap climate is Greenland, but several smaller islands near the Arctic Ocean also have permanent ice caps. Some places such as Alert, Nunavut despite being characterized as a tundra climate share some characteristics of an ice cap climate, in that although Alert averages above freezing during July and August, during most years the snow does not completely melt except that is in direct sunlight and will often persist from year to year many years in a row without melting completely, but not enough remains to form any kind of glaciation.

Ice cap climates are not nearly as common on land in the extreme northern latitudes as in Antarctica. This is because the Arctic Ocean moderates the temperatures of the surrounding land, making the extreme cold seen in Antarctica impossible. In fact, the coldest winters in the northern hemisphere are in subarctic climates in Siberia, such as Verkhoyansk, which are much farther inland and lack the ocean's moderating effect. This same lack of moderating oceanic effect, coupled with the extreme continentality of the Russian interior allows for very warm summers in the same areas that experience harsh winters.

Extreme southern latitudes

The continent of Antarctica is centered on the South Pole. Antarctica is surrounded on all sides by the Southern Ocean. As a result, high-speed winds circle around Antarctica, preventing warmer air from temperate zones from reaching the continent.

While Antarctica does have some small areas of tundra on the northern fringes, the vast majority of the continent is extremely cold and permanently frozen. Because it is climatically isolated from the rest of the Earth, the continent has extreme cold not seen anywhere else, and weather systems rarely penetrate into the continent.

Extreme altitudes

Mountain glaciers are widespread, especially in the Andes, the Himalayas, the Rocky Mountains, the Caucasus, and the Alps.

Extraterrestrial
Mars, like Earth, has ice caps at its poles. In addition to frozen water, Mars ice caps also have frozen carbon dioxide, commonly known as dry ice. In addition, Mars has seasons similar to Earth. The North Pole of Mars has a permanent water ice cap and a winter-only dry ice cap. On the south pole, both the water and carbon dioxide are permanently frozen.

Europa, a moon of Jupiter, is covered with a permanent sheet of water ice, similar to Antarctica. Scientists theorize that it may have sub-glacial lakes similar to those seen in Antarctica.

Life

There is very little surface life in ice cap climates. Vegetation cannot grow on ice, and is non-existent except in the warmer fringes that occasionally peak above freezing, even then it is confined to mosses and lichen. However, the fringes of ice caps do have significant animal life. Most of this life feeds on life in the surrounding oceans. Well known examples are polar bears in the northern region and penguins in Antarctica.

Antarctica has several subglacial lakes underneath its ice sheet. Scientists have theorized that there  may be life forms living in these lakes. In the summer of 2011–2012, Russian scientists drilled an ice core into Lake Vostok in Antarctica, but the core has not yet been analyzed. Scientists are particularly worried about accidentally contaminating the subglacial lakes with life forms from outside.

References

Köppen climate types
Climate of Greenland
Climate of Antarctica
climate